Gymnastikos Syllogos Iraklis Basketball Club is a Greek professional basketball team that is located in Thessaloniki. It serves as the senior men's basketball section of the multi-sport club of G.S. Iraklis. Iraklis currently plays in the second-tier level Greek A2 Basket League.

The team's colors are blue and white. Iraklis won the Greek National Championship in 1928 and 1935, and has also reached the Greek Cup final three times. Some of the greatest players in Greek, European and worldwide basketball have played for Iraklis over the years including: Lefteris Kakiousis, Jure Zdovc, James Donaldson, Walter Berry, Xavier McDaniel, Roy Tarpley, Nikos Chatzivrettas, Vasily Karasev, Lazaros Papadopoulos, Dimitris Diamantidis and Sofoklis Schortsanitis.

History
The Iraklis parent athletic club was founded in 1908, and initially featured football. The club was named after Heracles (or Hercules), the mythical Greek demigod. The basketball team of Iraklis was established in 1921.

Iraklis won the inaugural Greek League championship in 1928. To win the championship, Iraklis had to eliminate AEK Athens and Near East, before beating VAO in the championship game. The team won its second Greek championship in 1935. Also in the team's history, three times Iraklis finished in second place in the Greek Championship (1936, 1962, and 1964), three times Iraklis has been a Greek Cup Finalist (1981, 1994, and 1996), and two times Iraklis made it to the semifinals of the European 2nd-tier level league Cup Winners' Cup.

Iraklis reached the semifinals of the 1994–95 FIBA European Cup, where they competed against Taugrés. Iraklis won the first game 79–78, but lost the next two games, to be eliminated 2–1 in a best of three series. In 1996, an Iraklis team led by former NBA players Xavier McDaniel and Roy Tarpley, reached the Greek Cup Final Four. By beating Apollon Patras in the semifinal, Iraklis reached the final, where it then lost 85–74 to Panathinaikos. Iraklis has also twice competed in the top European continental competitions. The club played in the European top-tier level European Champions' Cup in the 1995–96 season, and also competed in the FIBA SuproLeague during the 2000–01 season.

Recent history (2005-present)
In 2006, Iraklis was relegated to the Greek A2 Basket League, after finishing 13th in the first-tier Greek League. In 2010, after four seasons in the second-tier level Greek League, the team was promoted back up to the top-tier Greek Basket League. After one season in the Greek top-tier level, Iraklis was again relegated down to the A2, with two matches left in the season. At the end of the season, Iraklis chose to play in the third-tier level of Greek basketball, the Greek B Basket League, in order to clear its debts. The club was promoted to the Greek A2 Basket League in 2013, after finishing 2nd in its group, and after Peristeri failed to receive financial clearance to participate in the league.

In the 2018–19 season, Iraklis won the promotion playoffs of the Greek A2 League, and was promoted up to the top level Greek Basket League, for the first time in 8 years. During the 2019–20 season, Iraklis is taking part in the Greek Basket League organized by the Hellenic Basketball Federation. The season started in October 2019 and was scheduled to end in June 2020. However, due to the coronavirus pandemic, the championship was terminated earlier. Iraklis took the 7th place with 29 points, having 9 wins and 11 losses in a total of 20 games. In the 2020–21 season, Iraklis returned to European competitions, taking part in the qualifying round of the Basketball Champions League and later on in the 2020–21 FIBA Europe Cup where the club reached the Top16 round having 3 wins and 1 loss. In the 2020–21 season Iraklis took the 10th place with 29 points, having 7 wins and 15 losses in a total of 22 games.

In European-wide competitions

Honours and titles

European competitions
 FIBA Saporta Cup
 Semifinalists (2): 1994–95, 1996-97

Domestic competitions

 Greek League
 Champions (2): 1927–28, 1934–35
 Runners-up (3): 1935–36, 1961–62, 1963–64
 Greek Cup
 Runners-up (3): 1980–81, 1993–94, 1995–96
 Greek Second Division
 Champions (2): 1974–75, 1977–78

Home arena

In earlier times, Iraklis played its home games at the Thessaloniki Forum. Iraklis currently plays its home games in the Ivanofeio Sports Arena, an arena with a seating capacity of 2,500. The arena opened in 1987, and it was expanded to its current capacity in 1991. Ivanofeio is situated in the Thessaloniki city center, and it is owned by the GS Iraklis multi-sport club.

Supporters
The most prominent supporters' club of the team is Aftonomi Thira 10 (meaning Autonomous Gate 10), a fan club with a total of 15 branches in Northern Greece. The fan club is known for holding an antiracist stance, as it participates in the Ultras Antiracist Festival. Other activities of the fan club include the publication of a magazine, and the conducting of an annual festival. Other minor supporters' clubs are SFISE, Blue Boys, A.P.A.T.S.I., and Iraklis Fan Club of Athens. In a 2013 opinion poll, Iraklis was ranked as the 6th most popular basketball club in Greece, gathering 2.8% of the participating supporters' votes.

Players

Current roster

Depth chart

Notable players 

  David Ancrum (1987–92)
  Vangelis Angelou (1995–96)
  Walter Berry (1994–95)
  Roderick Blakney (2001–02)
  Steve Burtt Sr. (1995)
  Steve Bucknall (1996–98)
  Nikos Chatzivrettas (1997–02)
  Dimitris Diamantidis (1999–04)
  Byron Dinkins (1998–00)
  James Donaldson (1993–94)
  Toney Douglas (2021–22)
  Justin Hamilton (2004–05)
  Olivier Hanlan (2019–21)
  Savvas Iliadis (2002–05, 2011)
  Buck Johnson (1998–00)
  Lefteris Kakiousis  (1987–97, 2004–05, 2009–10)
  Dimitris Kalaitzidis (2002–05, 2016–20)
  Georgios Karagkoutis (2000–02)
  Vasily Karasev (2000–01)
  Takis Karatzoulidis (1971–85)
  Manthos Katsoulis (1990–93)
  Vassilis Kavvadas (2019–21)
  Xavier McDaniel (1995–96)
  Erik Meek (1996–97, 2001–02)
  Igor Milošević (2003–05)
  Aristeidis Moumoglou (1960–67, 1970–72)
  Dimitris Papadopoulos (1985–94, 1996–97)
  Lazaros Papadopoulos (1996–01, 2003–04)
  Michalis Polytarchou (2018–19)
  Vladimir Petrović-Stergiou (2009–11)
  Sotiris Sakellariou  (1971–84)
  Sofoklis Schortsanitis (2000–03)
  Charles Smith (1997)
  Nikos Stavropoulos (1992–93)
  Roy Tarpley (1996)
  Christos Tsekos (1986–92)
  Jure Zdovc (1993–96)

Head coaches

See also

Basketball in Greece
List of basketball clubs in Greece
Greek basketball clubs in European competitions
List of basketball clubs in Greece by major honours won
Thessaloniki Forum

References

External links
Official Website 
Eurobasket.com Team Profile
Press
Blue Arena

Iraklis Thessaloniki
 
Basketball teams established in 1924
Basketball teams in Greece